Ceratomantis saussurii is a species of praying mantis native to Myanmar, Thailand, and Borneo.

See also
List of mantis genera and species

References

Ceratomantis
Mantodea of Asia
Insects described in 1876